Katarraktis (Greek: Καταρράκτης, meaning "waterfall") (before 1928: Lopesi, in Greek: Λόπεσι) is a mountain village in the municipal unit of Farres in the municipality of Erymanthos in Achaea, Greece. It is 5 km east of Chalandritsa and 20 km southeast of Patras. In 2011 Katarraktis had a population of 93. The village is situated near a 110 meters high waterfall, hence the name of the village. Relics from the Mycenean period can be found in the vicinity.

Population

See also

List of settlements in Achaea

References

External links

 Katarraktis GTP Travel Pages

Populated places in Achaea